A congenital disorder of glycosylation (previously called carbohydrate-deficient glycoprotein syndrome) is one of several rare inborn errors of metabolism in which glycosylation of a variety of tissue proteins and/or lipids is deficient or defective. Congenital disorders of glycosylation are sometimes known as CDG syndromes. They often cause serious, sometimes fatal, malfunction of several different organ systems (especially the nervous system, muscles, and intestines) in affected infants. The most common sub-type is PMM2-CDG (formally known as CDG-Ia) where the genetic defect leads to the loss of phosphomannomutase 2 (PMM2), the enzyme responsible for the conversion of mannose-6-phosphate into mannose-1-phosphate.

Presentation
The specific problems produced differ according to the particular abnormal synthesis involved. Common manifestations include ataxia; seizures; retinopathy; liver disease; coagulopathies; failure to thrive (FTT); dysmorphic features (e.g., inverted nipples and subcutaneous fat pads), pericardial effusion, and hypotonia. If an MRI is obtained; cerebellar hypoplasia is a common finding.

Ocular abnormalities of CDG-Ia include: myopia, infantile esotropia, delayed visual maturation, peripheral neuropathy (PN), strabismus, nystagmus, optic disc pallor, and reduced rod function on electroretinography. Three subtypes PMM2-CDG, PMI-CDG, ALG6-CDG can cause congenital hyperinsulinism with hyperinsulinemic hypoglycemia in infancy.

N-Glycosylation and known defects
A biologically very important group of carbohydrates is the asparagine (Asn)-linked, or N-linked, oligosaccharides. Their biosynthetic pathway is very complex and involves a hundred or more glycosyltransferases, glycosidases, transporters and synthases. This plethora allows for the formation of a multitude of different final oligosaccharide structures, involved in protein folding, intracellular transport/localization, protein activity, and degradation/half-life. A vast amount of carbohydrate binding molecules (lectins) depend on correct glycosylation for appropriate binding; the selectins, involved in leukocyte extravasation, is a prime example. Their binding depends on a correct fucosylation of cell surface glycoproteins. Lack thereof leads to leukocytosis and increase sensitivity to infections as seen in SLC35C1-CDG(CDG-IIc); caused by a GDP-fucose (Fuc) transporter deficiency.

All N-linked oligosaccharides originate from a common lipid-linked oligosaccharide (LLO) precursor, synthesized in the ER on a dolichol-phosphate (Dol-P) anchor. The mature LLO is transferred co-translationally to consensus sequence Asn residues in the nascent protein, and is further modified by trimming and re-building in the Golgi.

Deficiencies in the genes involved in N-linked glycosylation constitute the molecular background to most of the CDGs.
 Type I defects involve the synthesis and transfer of the LLO
 Type II defects impair the modification process of protein-bound oligosaccharides.

Type I

Type II
The mature LLO chain is next transferred to the growing protein chain, a process catalysed by the oligosaccharyl transferase (OST) complex.
 Once transferred to the protein chain, the oligosaccharide is trimmed by specific glycosidases. This process is vital since the lectin chaperones calnexin and calreticulin, involved in protein quality, bind to the Glc1Man9GlcNAc-structure and assure proper folding. Lack of the first glycosidase (GCS1) causes CDG-IIb.
 Removal of the Glc residues and the first Man residue occurs in the ER.
 The glycoprotein then travels to the Golgi, where a multitude of different structures with different biological activities are formed.
 Mannosidase I creates a Man5GlcNAc2-structure on the protein, but note that this has a different structure than the one made on LLO.
 Next, a GlcNAc residue forms GlcNAc1Man5GlcNAc2, the substrate for a-mannosidase II (aManII).
 aManII then removes two Man residues, creating the substrate for GlcNAc transferase II, which adds a GlcNAc to the second Man branch. This structure serves as substrate for additional galactosylation, fucosylation and sialylation reactions. Additionally, substitution with more GlcNAc residues can yield tri- and tetra-antennary molecules.

Not all structures are fully modified, some remain as high-mannose structures, others as hybrids (one unmodified Man branch and one modified), but the majority become fully modified complex type oligosaccharides.

In addition to glycosidase I, mutations have been found:
 in MGAT2, in GlcNAc transferase II (CDG-IIa)
 in SLC35C1, the GDP-Fuc transporter (CDG-IIc)
 in B4GALT1, a galactosyltransferase (CDG-IId)
 in COG7, the conserved oligomeric Golgi complex-7 (CDG-IIe)
 in SLC35A1, the CMP-sialic acid (NeuAc) transporter (CDG-IIf)

However, the use of >100 genes in this process, presumably means that many more defects are to be found.

Diagnosis

Classification
Historically, CDGs are classified as Types I and II (CDG-I and CDG-II), depending on the nature and location of the biochemical defect in the metabolic pathway relative to the action of oligosaccharyltransferase. The most commonly used screening method for CDG, analysis of transferrin glycosylation status by isoelectric focusing, ESI-MS, or other techniques, distinguish between these subtypes in so called Type I and Type II patterns.

Currently, twenty-two CDG Type-I and fourteen Type-II subtypes of CDG have been described.

Since 2009, most researchers use a different nomenclature based on the gene defect (e.g. CDG-Ia = PMM2-CDG, CDG-Ib = PMI-CDG, CDG-Ic = ALG6-CDG etc.). The reason for the new nomenclature was the fact that proteins not directly involved in glycan synthesis (such as members of the COG-family and vesicular H+-ATPase) were found to be causing the glycosylation defect in some CDG patients.

Also, defects disturbing other glycosylation pathways than the N-linked one are included in this classification. Examples are the α-dystroglycanopathies (e.g. POMT1/POMT2-CDG (Walker-Warburg syndrome and Muscle-Eye-Brain syndrome)) with deficiencies in O-mannosylation of proteins; O-xylosylglycan synthesis defects (EXT1/EXT2-CDG (hereditary multiple exostoses) and B4GALT7-CDG (Ehlers-Danlos syndrome, progeroid variant)); O-fucosylglycan synthesis (B3GALTL-CDG (Peter's plus syndrome) and LFNG-CDG (spondylocostal dysostosis III)).

Type I
 Type I disorders involve disrupted synthesis of the lipid-linked oligosaccharide precursor (LLO) or its transfer to the protein.

Types include:

Type II
 Type II disorders involve malfunctioning trimming/processing of the protein-bound oligosaccharide chain.

Types include:

Disorders of O-mannosylation
 Disorders with deficient α-dystroglycan O-mannosylation.

Mutations in several genes have been associated with the traditional clinical syndromes, termed muscular dystrophy-dystroglycanopathies (MDDG). A new nomenclature based on clinical severity and genetic cause was recently proposed by OMIM. The severity classifications are A (severe), B (intermediate), and C (mild). The subtypes are numbered one to six according to the genetic cause, in the following order: (1) POMT1, (2) POMT2, (3) POMGNT1, (4) FKTN, (5) FKRP, and (6) LARGE.

Most common severe types include:

Treatment
No treatment is available for most of these disorders. Mannose supplementation relieves the symptoms in MPI-CDG for the most part, even though the hepatic fibrosis may persist. Fucose supplementation has had a partial effect on some SLC35C1-CDG patients.

History
The first CDG patients (twin sisters) were described in 1980 by Jaeken et al. Their main features were psychomotor retardation, cerebral and cerebellar atrophy and fluctuating hormone levels (e.g.prolactin, FSH and GH). During the next 15 years the underlying defect remained unknown but since the plasmaprotein transferrin was underglycosylated (as shown by e.g. isoelectric focusing), the new syndrome was named carbohydrate-deficient glycoprotein syndrome (CDGS) Its "classical" phenotype included psychomotor retardation, ataxia, strabismus, anomalies (fat pads and inverted nipples) and coagulopathy.

In 1994, a new phenotype was described and named CDGS-II. In 1995, Van Schaftingen and Jaeken showed that CDGS-I (now PMM2-CDG) was caused by the deficiency of the enzyme phosphomannomutase. This enzyme is responsible for the interconversion of mannose-6-phosphate and mannose-1-phosphate, and its deficiency leads to a shortage in GDP-mannose and dolichol (Dol)-mannose (Man), two donors required for the synthesis of the lipid-linked oligosaccharide precursor of N-linked glycosylation.

In 1998, Niehues described a new CDG syndrome, MPI-CDG, which is caused by mutations in the enzyme metabolically upstream of PMM2, phosphomannose isomerase (PMI). A functional therapy for MPI-CDG, alimentary mannose was also described.

The characterization of new defects took increased and several new Type I and Type II defects were delineated.

In 2012, Need described the first case of a congenital disorder of deglycosylation, NGLY1 deficiency. A 2014 study of NGLY1 deficient patients found similarities with traditional congenital disorders of glycosylation.

See also 
 Inborn error of metabolism
 Leukocyte adhesion deficiency
 PMM2 deficiency

References

External links 

  GeneReviews/NIH/NCBI/UW entry on PMM2-CDG (CDG-Ia)Carbohydrate-Deficient Glycoprotein Syndrome, Type 1a; Congenital Disorder of Glycosylation Type 1a; Jaeken Syndrome
  OMIM entries on Carbohydrate-Deficient Glycoprotein Syndrome, Type 1a; Congenital Disorder of Glycosylation Type 1a; Jaeken Syndrome
 GeneReviews/NIH/NCBI/UW entry on Congenital Disorders of Glycosylation Overview

Inborn errors of metabolism
Glycoprotein metabolism disorders
Membrane transport protein disorders
Congenital disorders of glycosylation